PKN Orlen,  commonly known as Orlen, is a Polish multinational oil refiner and petrol retailer headquartered in Płock, Poland. The company's subsidiaries include the main oil and gas companies of the  Czech Republic and Lithuania, Unipetrol and Orlen Lietuva respecitvely.

The corporation is a significant European publicly traded firm with major operations in Poland, Czech Republic, Slovakia, Germany, and the Baltic states as well as an operation in Canada. As of February 2022, the largest shareholder of the company is the Polish state with 49.9% of the shares ahead of Nationale-Nederlanden OFE with 5.2% of the shares.

The company is listed on the Warsaw Stock Exchange and, as of 2022, its reported revenue constituted over PLN 278 billion (ca. US$62 billion). It employs over 21,000 people,  owns more than 3,000 service stations in five countries and markets its advanced products to over 100 countries worldwide.

PKN Orlen is the largest company in Central and Eastern Europe and is listed in global rankings such as Fortune Global 500, Platts TOP250 and Thompson Reuters TOP100.

History

Foundation (1999) 
The firm was created through the merger of two state-run petrochemical firms: C.P.N. (Centrala Produktów Naftowych), Communist Poland's petroleum retail monopoly and Petrochemia Płock, the state firm in charge of the oil refineries in Płock, the largest complex of its kind in Poland. After the merger of CPN and Petrochemia Płock in 1999, the company was renamed as Polski Koncern Naftowy (PKN), with Orlen added several months later as the consortium's brand name. The new name is derived from Orl- for "orzeł" (Polish: eagle) and its adjective "orli", and -en for "energia" (Polish: energy).

Privatization and Orlengate

In 1999, both firms were partially privatized and merged to create a retail and refining company under the name PKN Orlen.

Orlengate is the biggest corruption scandal in the modern political history of Poland. The scandal started with the arrest on 7 February 2002 by the UOP (Office for State Protection) of Andrzej Modrzejewski, the CEO of PKN Orlen. He was accused of insider trading and disclosure of confidential information. Zbigniew Wrobel directly succeeded as CEO and proposed in December 2002 $160 million for the purchase of 295 German gas stations from the British BP PLC. It was the first step in Wrobel's strategy of expanding west. At this time PKN Orlen was Poland's largest company, with sales of $7.2 billion.

International Expansions (2003-2014)
After losses in 2000 and 2001 the fund returned 25% in 2002. Until July 2003 it grew by nearly one-third since March and in total the fund was up by about 60% since the start in 1994.

In 2003 PKN Orlen had the chance to acquire 500 filling stations in Northern Germany from BP under premise of an anti-competition rule when BP took over Aral. As of 2007 PKN Orlen has 581 filling stations in Germany (484 under the Star brand, 58 under the Orlen brand and 29 under a supermarket brand).

In January 2003 PKN Orlen and MOL signed a Memorandum of Understanding whereby they agreed intention to initiate co-operation in the Central and Eastern European oil sector. They hoped that the collaboration would allow them both to benefit from the synergies and to compete more effectively in the global competition. In July 2003 the Croatian INA refinery was sold for $505 million to PKN Orlen's competitor, the Hungarian oil company MOL. This strengthen MOL's position in the battle for control of Central Europeans and Balkan fuel markets.

Furthermore, PKN Orlen was involved in merger talks with MOL Group in 2005. If merged, the two firms would have created a regional giant, and controlled much of Central Europe's oil industry. However, the planned merger failed due to high politicization. Following the dropped merger plans, PKN Orlen bought a majority stake in Czech Unipetrol. During May 2006, the company announced its largest investment ever when it took over a majority share of 84.3% of Lithuania's Mažeikių Nafta, the largest company in the Baltic states. It was partly bought from Yukos (53.7%) and partly from the Lithuanian government (30.6%) in December. Earlier on 12 October a fire damaged the Mažeikių refinery, which caused a loss about $75 million. With the completion of the takeover, PKN Orlen became Central Europe's largest company.

In May 2007 after Lithuania sold its refinery to PKN Orlen, Russian government approved the construction of a new $2 billion pipeline, that passes Belarus and Lithuania.

In 2007 the unit of Polish oil group PKN Orlen PKNA.WA and Dwory Chemicals bought a synthetic rubber company Kaucuk from Czech oil group Unipetrol UNPEsp.PR. The sale was part of a drive by Unipetrol to divest non-core assets and to focus on petrochemical, oil refinery and fuel retailing business.

In 2010 PKN Orlen had a reported revenue of $28.8 billion. Next year it was the largest fuel retailer in Poland with over 2000 locations. The company ran the most advanced and the second largest complex for terephthalic acid production in Europe.

In 2013 PKN Orlen and Klaipedos Nafta oil terminal negotiated the co-operation on a new pipeline supported by the Lithuanian government. In order to establish the company in Canada and to become an oil producer PKN Orlen bought the oil and gas company TriOil Resources Ltd for $169 million in September 2013. After its first foreign expansion the company acquired Birchill Exploration Ltd due to double its production in May 2014.

PKN Orlen, under a joint venture with the Netherlands firm Basell, also owns Poland's largest plastics company.

2015-present 
In 2019, PKN Orlen opened its first petrol station in Slovakia through its Czech subsidiary Unipetrol under the Benzina brand. At the end of 2020, 20 Orlen stations were operating in Slovakia.

At the end of 2019, Orlen and PZU established the "Sigma Bis" media agency.

Orlen has been implementing a development strategy since 2018, which involves transforming the company into a multi-energy and commercial group. In April 2020, PKN Orlen acquired 80% of Energa shares, and on 14 July 2020 announced that it obtained permission the European Commission's for the takeover of Lotos which is expected to close in June or July 2022. On August 1, 2022, Orlen finalised the merger with Lotos.

In November 2020, Orlen it became the owner of 65% of Ruch SA shares. On 7 December 2020 Orlen signed an agreement to acquire 100% of shares in the media and press company "Polska Press" and the transaction was carried out on 1 March 2021. This decision was met with criticism from Polish Ombudsman, Adam Bodnar, who expressed his concern about the risk to freedom of speech that this takeover poses as PKN Orlen is a state-owned company and the constitutional right to press freedom excludes the possibility of political influence on the press, even an indirect one.  

In December 2020, Orlen bought an agricultural biogas plant Bioenergy Project, which it will transform into a biomethane plant. To secure supplies, the company Biozec, responsible for the sale and distribution of thermal energy supplied by the biogas plant, was also acquired. In 2021, Orlen bought 4 wind farms: in February, the Kanin farm with a capacity of 20 MW, and in March, another three with a total capacity of 89.4 MW.

On 14 July 2020, PKN Orlen announced its intention to take over PGNiG, and on 10 May 2021, it submitted a takeover application to the Office of Competition and Consumer Protection. In October 2022, Shareholders of PGNiG approved the company's takeover by PKN Orlen, this came after PKN Orlen Sharholders had done the same.

In 2020, the company announced its plans to become emission-neutral by 2050 becoming the first oil company from Central Europe to do so. In order to achieve this goal, by 2030, PKN Orlen aims to reduce CO2 emissions from its current refining and petrochemical assets by 20% and emissions from power generation by 33% CO2/MWh.

Sponsorship 
PKN Orlen has sponsored the Polish Athletic Association, the Polish Volleyball Association, the Polish Olympic and Paralympic Committees and various Polish motorsport competitors such as Bartosz Zmarzlik, Jakub Przygoński, Bartek Marszałek, Grupa Żelazny and Wojtek Bógdał.

In 2019, PKN Orlen sponsored Williams Racing and driver Robert Kubica in Formula One with 10 million Euro. After Kubica's move to Alfa Romeo Racing in a reserve driver role in 2020, the Polish petrol retailer became the co-title sponsor of the team as Alfa Romeo Racing Orlen in 2020 and 2021 and as Alfa Romeo F1 Team Orlen in 2022. In January 2023, PKN Orlen signed a multi-year agreement with Scuderia AlphaTauri as a principal partner.

Brands and subsidiaries of Grupa Orlen (PKN Orlen Group)

Brands of PKN Orlen 

 Orlen (Polish market petrol station brand)
 Star (German market petrol station brand)
Unipetrol (Czech national petrol firm)
Orlen Lietuva (Lithuanian market petrol station brand)
 Benzina (Czech and Slovak market petrol station brand)

Orlen Group Structure

See also
List of petroleum companies
List of largest Polish companies

References

External links

  

1999 establishments in Poland
Automotive fuel retailers
Companies listed on the Warsaw Stock Exchange
Energy in Poland
Government-owned companies of Poland
Multinational companies headquartered in Poland
Non-renewable resource companies established in 1999
Oil and gas companies of Poland
Polish brands